Dalhousie is a hill station, near town of Chamba in Chamba district in the Indian state of Himachal Pradesh.

Etymology
Dalhousie Town was named after The Earl of Dalhousie, who was the British Governor-General in India while establishing this place as a summer retreat.

Climate
Dalhousie has a humid subtropical climate. Late summer and early spring see torrential rainfall due to monsoonal influence. The city sees over 90 frost days per year and 20-30 snowy days.

See also
Lootera, 2013 film shot in Dalhousie

References

External links

 
 More information about Dalhousie.

Cities and towns in Chamba district
Hill stations in Himachal Pradesh
Populated places established in 1854
1854 establishments in India